Monsignor Robert Sokolowski (born 3 May 1934) is a philosopher and Roman Catholic priest who serves as the Elizabeth Breckenridge Caldwell Professor of Philosophy at The Catholic University of America.

Sokolowski's philosophical research is focused primarily on the discipline of phenomenology and interrelated sub-disciplines, though he has also written works from a theological perspective. He is known for his interpretation of Husserl, commonly known as "East-Coast Husserlianism" in academic circles. His Introduction to Phenomenology has been translated into seven other languages.

Sokolowski has throughout his career maintained that philosophy begins with good distinctions.

Life

Early life 

Sokolowski was born on May 3, 1934, to Stanley A. Sokolowski and Maryann C. Drag of New Britain, Connecticut.

Sokolowski entered seminary formation at Theological College after being awarded a Basselin scholarship (named after Theodore B. Basselin), earning his bachelor's degree in Philosophy from The Catholic University of America in 1956 and a master's degree in 1957. He then went to the Catholic University of Leuven, where he earned his S.T.B in Theology (1961) and his Ph.D. in Philosophy (1963). His dissertation was titled "The Formation of Husserl's Concept of Constitution." His dissertation was written under Fr. Herman Leo Van Breda, the man who saved Husserl's writings from destruction by the Nazis, and who subsequently founded the Husserl Archives at the Leuven Higher Institute of Philosophy.

Academic posts 

Since earning his Ph.D. his entire teaching career has been at The Catholic University of America, with visiting posts at The New School for Social Research, University of Texas at Austin, Villanova University, and Yale University.

Bibliography

Author 
1. The Formation of Husserl's Concept of Constitution. Phaenomenologica 18. The Hague: Martinus Nijhoff, 1964.

2. Husserlian Meditations: How Words Present Things. Evanston: Northwestern University Press, 1974.

3. Presence and Absence: A Philosophical Investigation of Language and Being. Bloomington: Indiana University Press, 1978. Reprint, Washington, D.C.: The Catholic University of America Press, 2017.

4. The God of Faith and Reason: Foundations of Christian Theology.  Notre Dame: University of Notre Dame Press, 1982.  Reprint, with a new preface, Washington, D.C.: The Catholic University of America Press, 1995.
 Romanian translation, Dumnezeul credintei si al ratiunii.  Translated by Ioana Tataru. Targu-Lapus: Galaxia Gutenberg, 2007.  
 Polish translation. Bóg wiary i rozumu: Podstawy Chrzescijanskiej Teologii. Cracow: Dominikanska Biblioteka Teologii, 2015.
 Spanish translation. El Dios de la fe y de la razón. Translated by J. L. Albares Martín. Madrid: Biblioteca de Autores Cristianos, 2016.

5. Moral Action: A Phenomenological Study.  Bloomington: Indiana University Press, 1985. Reprint, Washington, D.C.: The Catholic University of America Press, 2017.
 Romanian translation.  Actiunea morala.  Translated by Stefan Gugura.  Targu-Lapus: Galaxia Gutenberg, 2009.

6. Pictures, Quotations, and Distinctions: Fourteen Essays in Phenomenology.  Notre Dame: University of Notre Dame Press, 1992.

7. Eucharistic Presence: A Study in The Theology of Disclosure.  Washington: The Catholic University of America Press, 1994. 
 Polish translation, Obecnosc Eucharystyczna: Studium z Teologii Fenomenologicznej. Tarnow: Biblos,1995. 
 Romanian translation.  Prezenta Eucharistica. Translated by Alex Moldovan.  Targu-Lapus: Galaxia Gutenberg, 2009.

8. Introduction to Phenomenology.  New York: Cambridge University Press, 2000. 
 Italian translation, Introduzione alla Fenomenologia.  Translated by Paola Premoli De Marchi.  Rome: Edizioni Università della Santa Croce, 2002.  
 Greek translation, Eisagoge ste Phainomenologia. Translated by Pavlos Kontos.  Patras: University of Patras, 2003.  
 Chinese translation, Taiwan: Psygarden Publishing Company, 2004. 
 Portuguese translation, Introdução à Fenomenologia. Translated by Alfredo de Oliveira Moraes.  San Paulo, Brazil: Edições Loyola, 2004. 
 Mainland Chinese translation. Translated by Gao Bingjiang and Zhang Jianhua. Wuhan: Wuhan University Press, 2009.
 Spanish translation. . Translated by Esteban Marín Ávila. Morelia, Michoacán [Mexico]: Editorial Jitanjáfora, 2012.   
 Polish translation.  Wprowadzenie do Fenomenologii.  Translated by Mariusz Rogalski.  Cracow: Wydawnictwo WAM, 2012.

9. Christian Faith and Human Understanding: Studies in the Eucharist, Trinity, and the Human Person. Washington, D.C.: The Catholic University of America Press, 2006.

10. Phenomenology of the Human Person. New York: Cambridge University Press, 2008.
 Spanish translation.  Fenomenología de la Persona Humana. Translated by Nekane de Legarreta Bilbao. Salamanca: Ediciones Sígueme, 2013.

11. Écrits de phénoménologie et de philosophie des sciences. Compiled, edited, and translated by André Lebel. Paris: Éditions Hermann, 2015.

Editor 
Edmund Husserl and the Phenomenological Tradition. Studies in Philosophy and in the History of Philosophy, 18. Washington: The Catholic University of America Press, 1988.

Festschrifts 
Drummond, John J. and James G. Hart (eds.). The Truthful and the Good: Essays in Honor of Robert Sokolowski. Boston: Kluwer Academic Publishers, 1996.

Mansini, Guy and James G. Hart (eds.). Ethics and Theological Disclosures: The Thought of Robert Sokolowski. Washington: The Catholic University of America Press, 2003.

See also 
 Phenomenology
 Noema
 Edmund Husserl

References

External links 
 Curriculum Vitae and bibliography
 Audio from appearance on The Partially Examined Life

American philosophers
Catholic University of America School of Philosophy faculty
Catholic University of America alumni
1934 births
Living people
Presidents of the Metaphysical Society of America
Catholic University of America faculty
American Roman Catholic priests
American people of Polish descent
Christian continental philosophers and theologians
Phenomenologists